Nippers are young surf lifesavers, usually aged between 5 and 14 years old, in clubs across Australia, New Zealand and South Africa.  Unlike senior surf lifesavers, the majority of them do not patrol the beaches. The focus for Nippers tends to be on fun, and surf awareness.

Nippers learn about safety at the beach.  They learn about dangers such as rocks, animals (e.g. the blue-ringed octopus), and surf conditions, such as rip currents, sandbars, and waves.  Older Nippers also learn some basic first aid and may also learn CPR when they reach the age of 13.

When Nippers are thirteen years old they can complete their SRC (Surf Rescue Certificate), enabling them to patrol beaches and partake in Senior Competition.

Like their Senior counterparts, Nippers participate in regular competition against other Surf Lifesaving Clubs, at sports carnivals.  Nippers are able to participate in a variety of Individual and Team events, including beach sprints, Flags, swimming and board races, relays, March Past, etc.  Unlike Seniors, Nippers do not compete in surf ski or surf boat races, and they also use shorter Surf Boards than their Senior counterparts.  Nippers start to compete when they are in the Under 8s age group.

The name and availability of the preschool-age group varies from club to club. These groups, sometimes called Tiny Tots or "Beach Worms", do not compete or learn first aid and surf awareness.  Tiny Tots' activities include games, wading and paddling.

Australia
The first Nippers club in Australia was started by Nambucca Heads Surf Life Saving Club, on the New South Wales mid-north coast, in 1961.

References

 Surf Life Saving Australia Nippers
 Disciplines of Competition - Illawarra site
 North Cronulla Nippers

External links
 Bondi SLSC Nippers
 Whitmore Bay Nipper Club, UK
 Nippers, the word and the story
 Lifesaving South Africa
 Life Saving New Zealand

Surf lifesaving
Sports originating in Australia
Lifesaving in Australia
Surf Life Saving New Zealand clubs
Lifesaving in New Zealand